Kapila Theertham is a famous Saivite Temple and Theertham, located at Tirupati in the Tirupati District of Andhra Pradesh, India. The idol is believed to be installed by Kapila Muni and hence Lord Siva here is referred to as Kapileswara.

The temple stands at the entrance to a mountain cave in one of the steep and vertical faces at the foot of the Tirumala hills which are part of Seshachalam Hills, where the waters of the mountain stream fall directly into Temple Pushkarini known as "Kapila Theertham".
A huge stone statue of a seated bull "Nandhi", Shiva's steed, greets devotees and passersby at the entrance to the temple.

Etymology
The Temple and Theertham had derived its name from Kapila Muni.

Legend 
According to Temple Legend Kapila Muni had performed penance to Siva at this place and blissed with the Muni's devotion, Siva and Parvathi presented themselves. The Lingam is believed to be self-manifested. Kapila muni is believed to emerged from the Bilam(Cavity) in the Pushkarini(Theertham) on to the earth.

History

Administration
The present day temple is under the administration of Tirumala Tirupati Devasthanams(TTD). Under TTD this temple receives continued protection and sustainance, annual festivals that are celebrated great splendour.

Religious importance
During 'Kartika' month on the occasion of its "mukkoti" on the 'Purnima' (full moon) day, all the teerthas situated in the three world's merge into this Kapila Teertham at noon for ten 'Ghatikas' (one ghatika is equivalent to 24 minutes).

Festivals
The temple celebrates all important festivals of Shaivism which includes Maha Shivaratri, Karthika Deepam, Vinayaka Chavithi, Adikirtika etc. Kapileswara Swamy Brahmotsavams is the biggest event of the temple celebrated by TTD during the month of February. It is a nine-day event where the processional deity of Lord Shiva and Parvathi will taken procession on different vahanams starting with Hamsa vahanam and ending with Trishula snanam (celestial bath to Siva Trident).

Sub-Shrines
There are many sub-shrines with-in the main temple premises. Temples for Kamakshi-concert of Shiva, Vinayaka, Subhramanya, Agasthesswara, Rukmini Satyabhama Sametha Sri Krishna are few among them.

See also
Hindu Temples in Tirupati
Kapila
Kapileshwar Temple, Bihar

References

Tirupati
Hindu temples in Tirupati district
Tirumala Tirupati Devasthanams
Buildings and structures in Tirupati
Shiva temples in Andhra Pradesh